The Headington Shark (proper name Untitled 1986) is a rooftop sculpture located at 2 New High Street, Headington, Oxford, England, depicting a large shark embedded head-first in the roof of a house. It was protest art, put up without permission, to be symbolic of bombs crashing into buildings.

Description and location

The shark first appeared on 9 August 1986, having been commissioned by the house's owner Bill Heine, a local radio presenter. The sculpture was inspired by Heine hearing American warplanes flying from Upper Heyford near Oxford on their way to bomb Libya in retaliation for its terrorist attacks on American troops, and it was put up as a protest against the bombing, as well as making a statement against nuclear weapons, with the shark being used as a metaphor for falling bombs. 

The shark was designed by sculptor John Buckley and constructed by Anton Castiau, a local carpenter and friend of Buckley.  Heine said, "The shark was to express someone feeling totally impotent and ripping a hole in their roof out of a sense of impotence and anger and desperation... It is saying something about CND, nuclear power, Chernobyl and Nagasaki".  The sculpture was erected on the 41st anniversary of the dropping of the Fat Man atomic bomb on Nagasaki.

It took three months to build. The structure is in deliberate contrast with its otherwise ordinary suburban setting.

For the occasion of the shark's 21st anniversary in August 2007, it was renovated by the sculptor following earlier complaints about the condition of the sculpture and the house.

On 26 August 2016, Heine's son Magnus Hanson-Heine bought the house in order to preserve the shark. In July 2017, the original house owner was diagnosed with leukaemia; he died on 2 April 2019. The property has been run as an Airbnb guesthouse since 2018. Magnus also runs a website for general information and inquiries about the shark.

In 2022, the Oxford City Council made the sculpture a heritage site for its "special contribution" to the community, despite objection by Hanson-Heine, who stated "using the planning apparatus to preserve a historical symbol of planning law defiance is absurd".

Council opposition
The shark was controversial when it first appeared. Oxford City Council tried to have it taken down on grounds of safety, and then on the grounds that it had not given planning permission for the shark, offering to host it at the local swimming pool instead, but there was much local support for the shark. Eventually, the matter was taken to the central government, where Tony Baldry, a minister in the Department of the Environment, who assessed the case on planning grounds, ruled in 1992 that the shark would be allowed to remain as it did not result in harm to the visual amenity.
Michael Heseltine’s planning inspector, Peter MacDonald, investigated and ultimately came out in favour of keeping the sculpture, with an official ruling that has gained legendary status among town planners for its defence of art.
“In this case it is not in dispute that the shark is not in harmony with its surroundings, but then it is not intended to be in harmony with them,” wrote Macdonald in his official ruling. The council is understandably concerned about precedent here. The first concern is simple: proliferation with sharks (and heaven knows what else) crashing through roofs all over the city. This fear is exaggerated. In the five years since the shark was erected, no other examples have occurred ... any system of control must make some small place for the dynamic, the unexpected, the downright quirky. I therefore recommend that the Headington Shark be allowed to remain.”

Media appearances
Bill Heine wrote a short book about the shark, which was published in 2011.

In 2013, the sculpture was the subject of an April Fools' Day story in the Oxford Mail, which announced the establishment of a fictitious £200,000 fund by Oxford City Council to support the creation of similar sculptures on the roofs of other homes in the area.

In 2018, students from Oxford Brookes University created a magazine called 'The Shark', inspired by the Headington Shark.

See also 
 Cardiff Kook, a 2007 sculpture in California which had a shark added to it
 The Physical Impossibility of Death in the Mind of Someone Living, 1991 shark-based artwork by Damien Hirst
 Sharks!, a 2020 sculpture in London

References

Further reading

External links

 
 Headington Shark community page
 John Buckley sculptor website
 Bill Heine's book (August 2011) revealing why and how a shark landed on his roof
 Headington Shark,  360° panorama (QuickTime)
 Planning Appeal Decision 1 August 2005
 "The government approves of this shark now." by Tom Scott on YouTube

1986 sculptures
1986 establishments in England
Outdoor sculptures in England
Tourist attractions in Oxford
Buildings and structures in Oxford
Culture in Oxford
Sharks in art
Fiberglass sculptures in the United Kingdom